Chilades serrula is a butterfly in the family Lycaenidae. It is found in Senegal.

References

Butterflies described in 1890
Chilades
Butterflies of Africa